German submarine U-1301 was a Type VIIC/41 U-boat of Nazi Germany's Kriegsmarine during World War II.

She was ordered on 2 April 1942, and was laid down on 20 January 1943, at Flensburger Schiffbau-Gesellschaft, Flensburg, as yard number 494. She was launched on 22 December 1943, and commissioned under the command of Oberleutnant zur See Karl-Heinrich Feufel on 11 February 1944.

Design
German Type VIIC/41 submarines were preceded by the heavier Type VIIC submarines. U-1301 had a displacement of  when at the surface and  while submerged. She had two shafts and two  propellers.

U-1301 was fitted with five  torpedo tubes (four fitted at the bow and one at the stern), fourteen torpedoes, one  SK C/35 naval gun, (220 rounds), one  Flak M42 and two  C/30 anti-aircraft guns. The boat had a complement of between forty-four and fifty-two.

Service history
On 9 May 1945, U-1301 surrendered at Bergen, Norway. She was later transferred to Loch Ryan, Scotland on 2 June 1945. Of the 156 U-boats that eventually surrendered to the Allied forces at the end of the war, U-1301 was one of 116 selected to take part in Operation Deadlight. U-1301 was towed out and sank on 16 December 1945, by bombs from British aircraft.

See also
 Battle of the Atlantic

References

Bibliography

German Type VIIC/41 submarines
U-boats commissioned in 1944
World War II submarines of Germany
1943 ships
Ships built in Flensburg
Maritime incidents in December 1945
World War II shipwrecks in the Atlantic Ocean
Operation Deadlight
U-boats sunk by British aircraft
Submarines sunk by aircraft as targets